Claudio is an Italian and Spanish first name. In Portuguese it is accented Cláudio. In Catalan and Occitan it is Claudi, while in Romanian it is Claudiu.

Origin and history
Claudius was the name of an eminent Roman gens, the most important members of which were:
 Claudius, Emperor Tiberius Claudius Caesar Augustus Germanicus
 Appius Claudius Sabinus Regillensis (fl. 486 BC), founder of the family, originally a Sabine known as Attius Clausus. 
 Appius Claudius Crassus (fl.450BC), public official, decemvir in 451 BC, appointed to codify the laws.
 Appius Claudius Caecus (fl.300BC), official orator, best known for the highway named after him, the Appian Way. Consul in 307 & 296.
 Claudius Gothicus (210–270), officer in the Roman army and a provincial governor

First name: Claudio
Claudio became a popular first name due to the spread of Christianity during the Middle Ages. Claudio is also used in Spanish and in Portuguese, accented as Cláudio. Notable people with the name include:
 Claudio Abbado (1933–2014), Italian conductor
 Claudio Aranzadi (born 1946), Spanish engineer, businessman and politician
 Claudio Acquaviva (1543–1615), Italian Jesuit
 Claudio Arrau (1903–1991), Chilean-born pianist
 Claudio Barragán (born 1964), Spanish footballer
 Claudio Beauvue (born 1988), French professional footballer from Guadeloupe who plays as a striker for Spanish club Celta de Vigo
 Claudio Biern Boyd (1940–2022), Spanish animator who founded the Spanish animation company BRB Internacional
 Claudio Bravo (born 1983), Chilean footballer
 Claudio Castagnoli (born 1980), Swiss-born professional wrestler also known as Cesaro.
 Claudio Cirillo (born ?), Italian cinematographer, film  Scent of a Woman We All Loved Each Other So Much (1974) and Crime Busters (1977)
 Claudio Cabán (born 1963), Puerto Rican long-distance runner
 Claudio Caniggia (born 1967), Argentine retired footballer who played as forward or winger
 Claudio Chiappucci (born 1963), retired Italian professional cyclist
 Claudio Donoso, Chilean forester
 Claudio García (born 1963), former Argentinian international footballer
 Claudio Gentile (born 1953), Italian football coach and former player
 Claudio Lolli (1950–2018), Italian singer-songwriter, poet and writer
 Claudio Magris (born 1939), Italian writer
 Claudio Marchisio (born 1986), Italian footballer
 Claudio Merulo (1533–1604), Italian composer and organist
 Claudio Monteverdi (1567–1643), Italian composer
 Claudio Patrignani (born 1959), Italian middle-distance runner
 Claudio Ranieri (born 1951), Italian football manager and player
 Claudio Sanchez (born 1978), lead singer and guitarist; of Coheed and Cambria
 Claudio Saracini (1586–1630), Italian composer
 Claudio Simonetti (born 1952), Italian composer
 Claudio Teehankee (1918–1989), Philippine Chief Justice
 Claudio Vitalone (1936–2008), Italian judge and politician
 Claudio Zulianello (born 1965), Argentine volleyball player

In fiction
 Claudio, in William Shakespeare's play Much Ado About Nothing
 Claudio, in William Shakespeare's play Measure for Measure
 Claudio Kilgannon, in The Amory Wars series of science fiction comic books and novels
 Claudio Serafino, in the Tekken video game series

First name: Cláudio
Cláudio is the Portuguese name derived from Claudius. Notable people with the name include:

Mononymic footballers 
 Cláudio César de Aguiar Mauriz (1940–1979), commonly known as Cláudio, Brazilian footballer
 Cláudio Christovam de Pinho (1922–2000), commonly known as Cláudio, Brazilian footballer
 Cláudio Mendes Prates (born 1965), commonly known as Cláudio, Brazilian footballer
 Luiz Cláudio Barros (born 1978), commonly known as Luiz Cláudio, Brazilian footballer
 Cláudio Roberto Siqueira Fernandes (born 1980), commonly known as Cláudio, Brazilian footballer
 Luís Cláudio Carvalho da Silva (born 1987), commonly known as Cláudio, Brazilian footballer

Given name 
 Cláudio Taffarel (born 1966), Brazilian footballer
 Cláudio Adão (born 1955), Brazilian footballer
 Caçapa, Brazilian footballer Cláudio Roberto da Silva (born 1978)
 Lito (Cape Verdean footballer), Cape Verdean footballer Cláudio Zélito Fonseca Fernandes Aguiar (born 1975)

See also
 
 Claudinho (disambiguation)
 Publius Claudius Pulcher (disambiguation)

Italian-language surnames
Italian masculine given names
Portuguese masculine given names
Spanish masculine given names